Brodie McGhie Willcox (1786–1862) was a Liberal Party Member of Parliament (MP) and the co-founder of the Peninsular & Oriental Steam Navigation Company, one of the United Kingdom's largest shipping businesses.

Career
Having established himself as a shipbroker, Brodie Willcox recruited Arthur Anderson initially as a clerk and then as a partner to operate a shipping business sailing around the Iberian Peninsula.

In 1837 Brodie Willcox and Arthur Anderson established the Peninsular & Oriental Steam Navigation Company. Brodie Willcox served as the first Managing Director of the business which by the 1860s was the owner of the largest steamship fleet in the World.

In the 1847 general election Brodie Willcox was elected as a Member of Parliament (MP) for Southampton. He remained an MP for the rest of his life.

He died in Roydon near Portsmouth in 1862 in an accident. He is buried on the western side of Highgate Cemetery.

Family
He was married to Sophia Ann Willcox (née Van der Gucht).

References

External links
 

1786 births
1862 deaths
Burials at Highgate Cemetery
English businesspeople
Liberal Party (UK) MPs for English constituencies
UK MPs 1847–1852
UK MPs 1852–1857
UK MPs 1857–1859
UK MPs 1859–1865
19th-century British businesspeople